Yitzhak Aharon (Ira A.) Korff is the present Rebbe of Zvhil – Mezhbizh. Since 1975 he has been the Chaplain of the City of Boston (serving the Boston Police and Fire Departments, Mayor's Office, and other City departments and agencies) and spiritual leader of Congregation Bnai Jacob, Zvhil–Mezhbizh Beit  Medrash of Boston, Miami, and Jerusalem, serving also with the Chief Rabbis of Israel as Spiritual Leader of The Jerusalem Great Synagogue.  He is a dayan (judge of Jewish law) of the BaDaTz Boston Beth din (rabbinical court) and Vaad HaRabbonim (council of rabbis). He is also principal of Korff Associates, consultants in business, diplomacy and international law and relations, Consul to the government of Austria and publisher of the Boston-based Jewish newspaper The Jewish Advocate.

Family 
Korff's father was Nathan (Nochum or Menachem Nochum) Korff, who served as founding rabbi of Congregation B'nai Jacob in Milton, Massachusetts.  His uncle Baruch Korff was well known as a spiritual advisor to Richard Nixon.

Korff is a direct descendant of the Baal Shem Tov, the 18th century founder of the Hasidic movement, through both the Baal Shem Tov’s grandson Rabbi Boruch of Medzhybizh, founder of the Mezhbizh Hasidic dynasty, as well as patrilineally through the Baal Shem Tov's son. Korff is also descended from numerous other Hasidic dynasties, including Zlotshev, Chernobyl, Apt, Yampol and Karlin, as well as Zvhil.

He is also a descendant of the Chabad chasidic dynasty through the Dovber Schneuri’s daughter and son-in-law Rabbi Yaakov Yisroel of Cherkass, son of Mordechai Twerski of Chernobyl.

His first wife, Shari Redstone whom he married in 1980 and later divorced, is the daughter of Sumner Redstone, Chairman of the Board and controlling shareholder of the Viacom and CBS Corporation media conglomerates.

His second wife is a native of Jerusalem and a descendant of the Baal Shem Tov and the Hasidic dynasties of Zvhil, Zlotshev, and Tshernobl. She is the daughter of the late Shomer Emunim Rebbe, Avrohom Chayim Roth of Jerusalem and Bnei Brak. Her mother, Korff's third cousin, was the daughter of the previous Zvhiler Rebbe of Jerusalem, Mordechai.

Education
He received three ordinations (Smicha, D.D.), educated at Yeshiva Rabbi Chaim Berlin, the Rabbinical Seminary of Israel, and Yeshivas Beis Mordechai (Zvhil) of Jerusalem, and was tutored privately by masters of Hasidism and Kabbalah.

Korff is a graduate of Columbia University, Harvard University, Hebrew College, Brooklyn Law School, and Boston University School of Law, and holds the BA., B.J.E., J.D., and LL.M. degrees.  In conjunction with The Fletcher School of Law and Diplomacy and the Harvard Law School International Law Center he received an M.A. in international relations, an M.A.L.D. in international law and diplomacy, and a Ph.D. in international law.  He was also a resident graduate at Harvard Divinity School.

He is admitted to the Bar in Massachusetts and Washington, DC, and to the US Supreme Court, US Court of International Trade, and US Tax Court.

Career
Korff simultaneously combined careers as a rabbi, chaplain, lawyer, diplomat, businessman and entrepreneur. His grandfather Jacob I. Korff was a Hasidic Rebbe, and he eventually assumed the position of successor to his grandfather.

In the late 1970s and early 1980s, Korff served as rabbi of several Orthodox congregations in Boston and Providence, at Temple Beth Sholom in Providence which he converted from Conservative to Orthodox (becoming Cong. Beth Sholom), and at Temple Aliyah, a Conservative synagogue in Needham.

He organized and staffed one of the first White Collar Crime Units and Juvenile Diversion Units in the United States as a special consultant to the Norfolk County (Mass.) District Attorney's Office, and he served as a Special Assistant Attorney General for Massachusetts.  On a political level he has advised candidates for political office at the City Council, Mayoral, Mass. Senate, Governor’s Office, and U.S. Senate and Congressional level, and assisted officials in substantive matters following their election to office.

After marrying Shari Redstone, Korff also went into the family's entertainment business, which he expanded internationally. He served as president of National Amusements, the Redstone family business through which they exercise various degrees of control in Viacom and CBS, from 1987 until 1994, two years after the divorce, served as Executive Vice President and on the Board of Directors of Viacom, and remained a consultant to Mr. Redstone and his company until 2009.

He has served as an advisor and consultant in both public and private international relations, assisting numerous governments (including the United States, the U.K., Austria, Thailand, China, Jordan and others) in matters of diplomacy and international relations, and he has advised numerous national and multi-national business ventures in the United States and abroad.

Works 
Korff is the author of Meshivas Nefesh Yitzchok: Insights of a Contemporary Chassidic Master, in the original Hebrew/Yiddish/Aramaic and in English translation, on Kabbalah and Halakha, Jewish laws.

See also 
 Mezhbizh (Hasidic dynasty)
 Zhvil (Hasidic dynasty)

References

Sources 
 Toldos Anshei Shem, Rand and Greenblat, New York, 1950
 Sefer Meshivas Nefesh Yitzhak, New York, 2000, 2001, second Revised Edition 
 HaHasidut, Prof. Yizhak Alfasi, Jerusalem.

External links 
Rebbe.org

Living people
Year of birth missing (living people)
Place of birth missing (living people)
Lawyers from Boston
Korff, Grand Rabbi Yitzhak Aharon
Korff, Grand Rabbi Yitzhak Aharon
Korff, Grand Rabbi Yitzhak Aharon
Hasidic rebbes
American Hasidic rabbis
American Ashkenazi Jews
Descendants of the Baal Shem Tov
The Fletcher School at Tufts University alumni
Yitzhak
Brooklyn Law School alumni